The Gould Amendment sponsored by Rep. Samuel W. Gould (D) of Maine, amended the Pure Food and Drug Act of 1906 by requiring that the contents of any food package had to be “plainly and conspicuously marked on the outside of the package in terms of weight, measure, or numerical count and ingredients”

External links 
 

1913 in American law
62nd United States Congress
United States federal trade legislation